The Witnesses Act 1806 is an Act of the Parliament of the United Kingdom which prohibits a witness from refusing to answer a question solely on the ground that the answer may establish that he owes a debt or is liable to civil suit (but would not incriminate him). It is still in force.

References

United Kingdom Acts of Parliament 1806